Eugene G. Sander is a former president of the University of Arizona serving from 2011 to 2012. He was appointed after the resignation of Robert N. Shelton to lead the Fiesta Bowl.

Career
Sander had been vice provost and dean of the UA's College of Agriculture and Life Sciences prior to deferring his retirement to become president.

References

External links

 

Living people
Presidents of the University of Arizona
University of Arizona faculty
University of Florida faculty
Cornell University College of Agriculture and Life Sciences alumni
Cornell University faculty
University of Minnesota College of Food, Agricultural and Natural Resource Sciences alumni
Year of birth missing (living people)